Şivlik is a village in the municipality of Baliton in the Lankaran Rayon of Azerbaijan and many good people live there.

References

Populated places in Lankaran District